The long jump is a track and field event in which athletes combine speed, strength and agility in an attempt to leap as far as possible from a takeoff point.  Along with the triple jump, the two events that measure jumping for distance as a group are referred to as the "horizontal jumps". This event has a history in the ancient Olympic Games and has been a modern Olympic event for men since the first Olympics in 1896 and for women since 1948.

Rules

At the elite level, competitors run down a runway (usually coated with the same rubberized surface as running tracks, crumb rubber or vulcanized rubber, known generally as an all-weather track) and jump as far as they can from a wooden or synthetic board, 20 centimetres or 8 inches wide, that is built flush with the runway, into a pit filled with soft damp sand. If the competitor starts the leap with any part of the foot past the foul line, the jump is declared a foul and no distance is recorded. A layer of plasticine is placed immediately after the board to detect this occurrence. An official (similar to a referee) will also watch the jump and make the determination. The competitor can initiate the jump from any point behind the foul line; however, the distance measured will always be perpendicular to the foul line to the nearest break in the sand caused by any part of the body or uniform. Therefore, it is in the best interest of the competitor to get as close to the foul line as possible. Competitors are allowed to place two marks along the side of the runway in order to assist them to jump accurately. At a lesser meet and facilities, the plasticine will likely not exist, the runway might be a different surface or jumpers may initiate their jump from a painted or taped mark on the runway. At a smaller meet, the number of attempts might also be limited to four or three.

Each competitor has a set number of attempts. That would normally be three trials, with three additional jumps being awarded to the best eight or nine (depending on the number of lanes on the track at that facility, so the event is equatable to track events) competitors. All valid attempts will be recorded but only the best mark counts towards the results. The competitor with the longest valid jump (from either the trial or final rounds) is declared the winner at the end of competition. In the event of an exact tie, then comparing the next best jumps of the tied competitors will be used to determine place. In a large, multi-day elite competition (like the Olympics or World Championships), a qualification is held in order to select at least 12 finalists. Ties and automatic qualifying distances are potential factors. In the final, a set of trial round jumps will be held, with the best eight performers advancing to the final rounds. (For specific rules and regulations in United States Track & Field see Rule 185)

For record purposes, the maximum accepted wind assistance is two metres per second (m/s) (4.5 mph).

History

The long jump is the only known jumping event of ancient Greece's original Olympics' pentathlon events. All events that occurred at the Olympic Games were initially supposed to act as a form of training for warfare. The long jump emerged probably because it mirrored the crossing of obstacles such as streams and ravines. After investigating the surviving depictions of the ancient event it is believed that unlike the modern event, athletes were only allowed a short running start. The athletes carried a weight in each hand, which were called halteres (between 1 and 4.5 kg). These weights were swung forward as the athlete jumped in order to increase momentum. It was commonly believed that the jumper would throw the weights behind him in midair to increase his forward momentum; however, halteres were held throughout the duration of the jump. Swinging them down and back at the end of the jump would change the athlete's center of gravity and allow the athlete to stretch his legs outward, increasing his distance. The jump itself was made from the bater ("that which is trod upon"). It was most likely a simple board placed on the stadium track which was removed after the event. The jumpers would land in what was called a skamma ("dug-up" area). The idea that this was a pit full of sand is wrong. Sand in the jumping pit is a modern invention. The skamma was simply a temporary area dug up for that occasion and not something that remained over time.

The long jump was considered one of the most difficult of the events held at the Games since a great deal of skill was required. Music was often played during the jump and Philostratus says that pipes at times would accompany the jump so as to provide a rhythm for the complex movements of the halteres by the athlete. Philostratus  is quoted as saying, "The rules regard jumping as the most difficult of the competitions, and they allow the jumper to be given advantages in rhythm by the use of the flute, and in weight by the use of the halter."

There has been some argument by modern scholars over the long jump. Some have attempted to recreate it as a triple jump. The images provide the only evidence for the action so it is more well received that it was much like today's long jump. The main reason some want to call it a triple jump is the presence of a source that claims there once was a fifty-five ancient foot jump done by a man named Phayllos.

The long jump has been part of modern Olympic competition since the inception of the Games in 1896. In 1914, Dr. Harry Eaton Stewart recommended the "running broad jump" as a standardized track and field event for women. However, it was not until 1948 that the women's long jump was added to the Olympic athletics programme.

Technique

There are five main components of the long jump: the approach run, the last two strides, takeoff, action in the air, and landing. Speed in the run-up, or approach, and a high leap off the board are the fundamentals of success. Because speed is such an important factor of the approach, it is not surprising that many long jumpers also compete successfully in sprints. A classic example of this long jump / sprint doubling are performances by Carl Lewis.

Approach
The objective of the approach is to gradually accelerate to a maximum controlled speed at takeoff. The most important factor for the distance travelled by an object is its velocity at takeoff – both the speed and angle. Elite jumpers usually leave the ground at an angle of twenty degrees or less; therefore, it is more beneficial for a jumper to focus on the speed component of the jump. The greater the speed at takeoff, the longer the trajectory of the center of mass will be. The importance of a takeoff speed is a factor in the success of sprinters in this event.

The length of the approach is usually consistent distance for an athlete. Approaches can vary between 12 and 19 steps on the novice and intermediate levels, while at the elite level they are closer to between 20 and 22 steps. The exact distance and number of steps in an approach depends on the jumper's experience, sprinting technique, and conditioning level. Consistency in the approach is important as it is the competitor's objective to get as close to the front of the takeoff board as possible without crossing the line with any part of the foot.

Last two steps
The objective of the last two steps is to prepare the body for takeoff while conserving as much speed as possible.

The penultimate step is longer than the previous ones and than the final one before takeoff. The competitor begins to lower his or her center of gravity to prepare the body for the vertical impulse. The last step is shorter because the body is beginning to raise the center of gravity in preparation for takeoff.

The last two steps are extremely important because they determine the velocity with which the competitor will enter the jump.

Takeoff

The objective of the takeoff is to create a vertical impulse through the athlete's center of gravity while maintaining balance and control.

This phase is one of the most technical parts of the long jump. Jumpers must be conscious to place the foot flat on the ground, because jumping off either the heels or the toes negatively affects the jump. Taking off from the board heel-first has a braking effect, which decreases velocity and strains the joints. Jumping off the toes decreases stability, putting the leg at risk of buckling or collapsing from underneath the jumper. While concentrating on foot placement, the athlete must also work to maintain proper body position, keeping the torso upright and moving the hips forward and up to achieve the maximum distance from board contact to foot release.

There are four main styles of takeoff: the kick style, double-arm style, sprint takeoff, and the power sprint or bounding takeoff.

Kick
The kick style takeoff is where the athlete actively cycles the leg before a full impulse has been directed into the board then landing into the pit. This requires great strength in the hamstrings. This causes the jumper to jump to large distances.

Double-arm
The double-arm style of takeoff works by moving both arms in a vertical direction as the competitor takes off. This produces a high hip height and a large vertical impulse.

Sprint
The sprint takeoff is the style most widely instructed by coaching staff. This is a classic single-arm action that resembles a jumper in full stride. It is an efficient takeoff style for maintaining velocity through takeoff.

Power sprint or bounding
The power sprint takeoff, or bounding takeoff, is one of the more common elite styles. Very similar to the sprint style, the body resembles a sprinter in full stride. However, there is one major difference. The arm that pushes back on takeoff (the arm on the side of the takeoff leg) fully extends backward, rather than remaining at a bent position. This additional extension increases the impulse at takeoff.

The "correct" style of takeoff will vary from athlete to athlete.

Action in the air and landing

There are three major flight techniques for the long jump: the hang, the sail, and the hitch-kick. Each technique is to combat the forward rotation experienced from take-off but is basically down to preference from the athlete. It is important to note that once the body is airborne, there is nothing that the athlete can do to change the direction they are traveling and consequently where they are going to land in the pit. However, it can be argued that certain techniques influence an athlete's landing, which can affect the distance measured. For example, if an athlete lands feet first but falls back because they are not correctly balanced, a lower distance will be measured.

In the 1970s, some jumpers used a forward somersault, including Tuariki Delamere who used it at the 1974 NCAA Championships, and who matched the jump of the then Olympic champion Randy Williams. The somersault jump has potential to produce longer jumps than other techniques because in the flip, no power is lost countering forward momentum, and it reduces wind resistance in the air. The front flip jump was subsequently banned for fear that it was unsafe.

Records

The men's long jump world record has been held by just four individuals for the majority of time since the IAAF started to ratify records. The first mark recognized by the IAAF in 1912, the  performance by Peter O'Connor, stood just short of 20 years (nine years as an IAAF record). Boston improved upon it and exchanged records with Igor Ter-Ovanesyan three times over the next seven years. On 30 August 1991, Mike Powell of the United States set the current men's world record at the World Championships in Tokyo. It was in a dramatic showdown against Carl Lewis who also surpassed Beamon's record that day, but his jump was wind-assisted (and thus not legal for record purposes). Powell's record of  has now stood for over  years.

Some jumps over  have been officially recorded. Wind-assisted  were recorded by Powell at high altitude in Sestriere in 1992. Despite a "legal" wind reading, the jump was not validated because videotape revealed a person standing in front of the wind gauge, invalidating the reading (and costing Pedroso a Ferrari valued at $130,000—the prize for breaking the record at that meet). As mentioned above, Lewis jumped  moments before Powell's record-breaking jump with the wind exceeding the maximum allowed. This jump remains the longest ever not to win an Olympic or World Championship gold medal, or any competition in general.

The women's world record has seen more consistent improvement, though the current record has stood longer than any other long jump world record by men or women. The longest to hold the record prior was by Fanny Blankers-Koen during World War II. who held it for over 10 years. There have been four occasions when the record was tied and three when it was improved upon twice in the same competition. The current women's world record is held by Galina Chistyakova of the former Soviet Union who leapt  in Leningrad on 11 June 1988, a mark that has now stood for over  years.

Continental records

Outdoor
Updated 11 July 2022

Notes

 Represents a mark set at a high altitude.

Indoor
Updated 17 September 2020

All-time top 25

Men (outdoor)

Assisted marks
Any performance with a following wind of more than 2.0 metres per second is not counted for record purposes. Below is a list of wind-assisted jumps (equal or superior to 8.51 m). Only best assisted mark that is superior to legal best is shown:
Mike Powell jumped 8.99 (+4.4)  in Sestriere, Italy on 21 July 1992.
Juan Miguel Echevarría jumped 8.92 (+3.3) in Havana, Cuba on 10 March 2019.
Carl Lewis jumped 8.91 (+2.9) in Tokyo, Japan on 30 August 1991.
Iván Pedroso jumped 8.79 (+3.0) in Havana, Cuba on 21 May 1992.
Fabrice Lapierre jumped 8.78 (+3.1) in Perth, Australia on 18 April 2010.
James Beckford jumped 8.68 (+4.9) in Odessa, Texas on 19 May 1995.
Marquis Dendy jumped 8.68 (+3.7) in Eugene, Oregon on 25 June 2015.
Joe Greene jumped 8.66 (+4.0)  in Sestriere, Italy on 21 July 1992.
Kareem Streete-Thompson jumped 8.64 (+3.5) in Knoxville, Tennessee on 18 June 1994.
Mike Conley jumped 8.63 (+3.9) in Eugene, Oregon on 20 June 1986.
Jeff Henderson jumped 8.59 (+2.9) in Eugene, Oregon on 3 July 2016.
Jason Grimes jumped 8.57 (+5.2) in Durham, North Carolina on 27 June 1982.
Kevin Dilworth jumped 8.53 (+4.9) in Fort-de-France, Martinique on 27 April 2002.
Ignisious Gaisah jumped 8.51 (+3.7) in Bambous, Mauritius on 9 August 2006.

Women (outdoor)

Assisted marks
Any performance with a following wind of more than 2.0 metres per second is not counted for record purposes. Below is a list of wind-assisted jumps (equal or superior to 7.16 m). Only best assisted mark that is superior to legal best is shown:
Heike Drechsler jumped 7.63 (+2.1)  in Sestriere, Italy on 21 July 1992.
Yulimar Rojas jumped 7.27 (+2.7) in La Nucia, Spain on 13 June 2021.
Tara Davis jumped 7.24 (+2.8) in Chula Vista, California on 9 July 2022.
Fiona May jumped 7.23 (+4.3)  in Sestriere, Italy on 29 July 1995.
Anastassia Mirochuk-Ivanova jumped 7.22 (+4.3) in Grodno, Belarus on 6 July 2012.
Susen Tiedtke jumped 7.19 (+3.7)  in Sestriere, Italy on 28 July 1993.
Eva Murková jumped 7.17 (+3.6) in Nitra, Czechoslovakia on 26 August 1984.

Men (indoor)

Women (indoor)

Olympic medalists

Men

Women

World Championships medalists

Men

Women

World Indoor Championships medalists

Men

Medal table

Women

Medal table

 Known as the World Indoor Games

Season's bests

Men

Women

National records
Updated 12 March 2023

Men (outdoor)
NR's equal or superior to 8.00 m:

Women (outdoor)
NR's equal or superior to 6.75 m:

Men (indoor)
NR's equal or superior to 8.00 m:

Women (indoor)
NR's equal or superior to 6.75 m:

See also

Notes and references

Cited sources

Further reading

External links

 IAAF long jump homepage
 IAAF list of long-jump records in XML
 Powell vs Lewis Tokyo 91 (video)

 
Events in track and field
Ancient Olympic sports
Summer Olympic disciplines in athletics
Articles containing video clips
Jumping sports